Nandipulam  is a village in Varandarappilly panchayath in  Thrissur district in the state of Kerala, India.

Location
Nandipulam is about 4km from NH544-Pudukkad, and 4Km from NH544-Kodakara.

Geography

Churches
St. Mary's church Nandipulam 

St. Mary's church Nandipulam (Manjoor)

Temples
Kumaranchira Bhagavathy Temple,
Payyoorkkavu Bhagavathy Temple,
Mithrananthapuram Sree Krishna Temple,
Edaleppilly Bhagavathy Temple

Demographics
 India census, Nandipulam had a population of 5615 with 2689 males and 2926 females.

References

Villages in Thrissur district